Paul Busti, or Paulus Busti or Paolo Busti (baptised 17 October 1749 – 23 July 1824), was the chief operating officer of the Holland Land Company from 1797 until his death. He was one of the first prominent real estate operators in the Philadelphia area.

Early life

Busti was born in Lombardy (Italy). He was the son of Giulio Cesare Busti, a Milanese banker, and Marianna Zappa and was baptised Pauolo Ignatio Gerardo Maria Busti.  Busti received a liberal education; he spoke several languages.

Career

From 1771, he was sent to Amsterdam, working in his uncle's counting house. He lived at Herengracht 455 (Golden Bend) and 619. (In 1796 the Bolongaro Simonetta Company liquidated.) In 1797 he moved to the United States.

Busti was named Agent General of the Holland Land Company following the departure of Theophilus Cazenove in 1799.  Busti supervised resident land agents located in Barneveld, New York, Cazenovia, New York, Batavia, New York and Meadville, Pennsylvania. Busti approved the establishment by Joseph Ellicott of the Holland Land Company Office in Batavia, New York,  In 1802 Harm Jan Huidekoper transferred to Philadelphia to become his assistant. Busti dealt with Robert Morris (financier), Aaron Burr, John Dunlap and Alexander Hamilton (the treasurer). Busti kept a diary and as a farmer he made notes about improving agriculture, and the weather. Twice Busti visited Western New York during his twenty-four years as leadership. There he met with Francois Adriaan van der Kemp, and John Lincklaen.

Personal life

In 1794 Busti married Elisabeth May, the daughter of John May, Jr. and Martha Naudin. The May family were of English origin and her father, uncle and grandfather were shipwrights, contractors, and suppliers for the Admiralty of Amsterdam. The Naudin family were merchants of French descent. Elisabeth's older sister, Martha May, was married to Isaak ten Cate, of one of the Holland Land Company investors.  Busti, who was predeceased by his wife in 1822, died on 23 July 1824 in Philadelphia, Pennsylvania.

Legacy
The Town of Busti, New York and the village of Busti in Chautauqua County are named after him. There is also a Busti Avenue in Buffalo, New York, and the Paolo Busti Cultural Foundation in Batavia, New York.

References

External links
 
 
 Cultural Identity and Paul Busti

1749 births
1824 deaths
Dutch emigrants to the United States
People from Lombardy
Businesspeople from Amsterdam